Kanarek is a surname. Notable people with the surname include:

Irving Kanarek (1920–2020), American lawyer
Yael Kanarek (born 1967), American artist